This is a list of all of the songs that Mr. Porter has produced.

Notes
 signifies an additional producer.
 signifies a co-producer.

References

Production discographies
Hip hop discographies
Discographies of American artists